Daniel Jackson Evans (born October 16, 1925) is an American politician who served as the 16th governor of Washington from 1965 to 1977, and as United States senator representing Washington State from 1983 to 1989.

Described as a moderate Republican, particularly on social and environmental issues, Evans supported Nelson Rockefeller for the Republican nomination for president in 1968 and refused to endorse Richard Nixon, despite giving the keynote address at that year's Republican National Convention. He was considered for the Republican vice presidential nomination that year, as well as in 1976. As of 2022, he is the only living former Republican governor of Washington.

Early life and education
Evans was born in Seattle, Washington (where he has lived ), descended from a family that had first arrived in the Washington Territory in 1859; his grandfather had served in one of Washington's first state senates. He grew up in the Laurelhurst neighborhood, and attended Roosevelt High School.

As a young man, Evans was an Eagle Scout, and served as a staff member and Hike Master at Camp Parsons, a well known Boy Scout camp in Washington State. As an adult, he was awarded the Distinguished Eagle Scout Award from the Boy Scouts of America.

After high school, he served in the United States Navy 1943–1946. He first entered the V-12 Navy College Training Program, and was stationed at the University of Washington (UW), but was transferred eight months later to an ROTC program at University of California, Berkeley. He did not see combat; he was deployed to the Pacific shortly after the end of World War II, as a commissioned ensign on a succession of aircraft carriers, before returning to UW in 1946.

Evans graduated from the University of Washington with degrees in civil engineering (BS, 1948; MS, 1949). The UW later (in 2007) gave him the distinction of Alumnus Summa Laude Dignitatus, the highest distinction the university confers on its graduates. He returned to the United States Navy (1951–1953) before working as a structural engineer (1953–1956); in the latter capacity, he helped draw up the plans for the Alaskan Way Viaduct.

Political career
Having attended Toastmasters to improve his initially abysmal public speaking style, Evans served in the Washington State House of Representatives from 1957 to 1965 before being elected governor.

Despite being a Republican and a self-styled conservative, Evans became known for his administration's liberal policies on environmental protection (he founded the country's first state-level Department of Ecology, which became Nixon's blueprint for the federal EPA) and strong support of the state's higher education system, including founding Washington's system of community colleges. In addition, he signed a bill to legalize abortion in the first four months of a pregnancy and fought unsuccessfully for a state income tax, two additional liberal positions.

Evans served as governor from 1965 until 1977, the second to be elected to three terms, after Arthur B. Langlie, in Washington state history. A 1981 University of Michigan study named him one of the ten outstanding American governors of the 20th century. He declined to run for a fourth term in 1976. Current governor Jay Inslee joined both Langlie and Evans, becoming the third Washington governor to serve three terms with his re-election victory in 2020.
Serial killer Ted Bundy served as a campaign aide for Evans, and maintained a close relationship with the governor. During the 1972 campaign, Bundy followed Evans's Democratic opponent around the state, tape recording his speeches, and reporting back to Evans personally. A minor scandal later followed when the Democrats found out about Bundy, who had been posing as a college student.

From 1977 to 1983, Evans served as the second president of The Evergreen State College in Olympia, which Evans had created in 1967 by signing a legislative act authorizing the formation of the college. The largest building on the Evergreen campus is named the Daniel J. Evans Library, in his honor. In 1983, Governor John Spellman appointed Evans to the United States Senate, to fill a seat left vacant by the death of long-time senator Henry M. "Scoop" Jackson. Evans won a special election later that year against Mike Lowry, and filled the remainder of Jackson's unexpired term, retiring from politics after the 1988 elections. He was unhappy during his term in the Senate, writing in a 1988 column in The New York Times Magazine that "debate has come to consist of set speeches read before a largely empty chamber" and adding that he felt demoralized by "bickering and protracted paralysis".

Evans voted in favor of the bill establishing Martin Luther King, Jr., Day as a federal holiday, and the Civil Rights Restoration Act of 1987 (as well as to override President Reagan's veto). Evans voted in favor of Robert Bork's nomination to the U.S. Supreme Court.

Later life
After leaving the Senate in 1989, Evans founded his own consulting firm, Daniel J. Evans Associates. Governor Mike Lowry appointed him to the Board of Regents of the University of Washington in 1993; Evans served as the board's president from 1996 to 1997, and in 1999, the Daniel J. Evans School of Public Affairs at the University was named for him. Evans also went on to work in media, doing an editorial weekly on the KIRO-TV newscasts from the early- to mid-1990s. In 2012, Evans was listed as a director of the Initiative for Global Development. His autobiography was published in 2022.

Wilderness preservation efforts
Evans was a Boy Scout whose early experiences hiking in the Olympic Mountains nurtured a life-long love of wilderness. Throughout his career, Evans has proven his dedication to the great outdoors in Washington State through his action.

Evans was a crucial supporter, in 1968, when Congress created the North Cascades National Park. The then-governor persuaded President Gerald Ford to sign 1976 legislation creating the Alpine Lakes Wilderness Area, when the U.S. Forest Service was urging a veto.

As a U.S. senator, Evans sponsored the million-acre Washington Park Wilderness Act, and legislation creating the Columbia Gorge National Scenic Area.

In 1989, Evans co-founded the Washington Wildlife and Recreation Coalition, with Mike Lowry.

In 2017, Olympic Wilderness was renamed to Daniel J. Evans Wilderness, in honor of Evans.

Statewide races in Washington
1983 U.S. Senate election
 Dan Evans - 672,326
 Mike Lowry - 540,981

1972 Washington gubernatorial election
 Dan Evans - 747,825
 Al Rosellini - 630,613

1968 Washington gubernatorial election
 Dan Evans - 692,378
 John J. O'Connell - 560,262

1964 Washington gubernatorial election
 Dan Evans - 697,256
 Al Rosellini - 548,692

References

Other sources
Eric McHenry, "Engineer of Change", Columns (the University of Washington alumni magazine), June 2007, p. 22–26.

External links 
Congressional Biography
The Daniel J. Evans School of Public Affairs

|-

|-

|-

|-

|-

|-

1925 births
Living people
20th-century American politicians
21st-century American male writers
21st-century American non-fiction writers
American Congregationalists
American autobiographers
American people of Welsh descent
Republican Party governors of Washington (state)
Republican Party members of the Washington House of Representatives
Military personnel from Seattle
Politicians from Seattle
Presidents of Evergreen State College
Regents of the University of Washington
Republican Party United States senators from Washington (state)
United States Navy officers
United States Navy personnel of World War II
University of Washington alumni
Writers from Seattle